The Herens (Eringer in German) is a breed of cattle named after the Val d'Hérens region of Switzerland. These small, horned alpine cattle are coloured black, brown or dark red, often with a lighter stripe along the spine. The cows are used in organised cow fights.

Characteristics 

Herens Cattle are one of the smallest cattle breeds in Europe. Their fur is dark red to brown or black, with pied animals being very uncommon. Newborn calves are red with a dark stripe along the back, with the colours reversing as they grow. A distinguishing feature is the short and broad head, with a concave front line. The animals are very muscular, with both sexes sporting strong horns.

Bulls typically reach a height of 125–134 cm, weighing 650–700 kg. Cows reach 118–128 cm and 500–600 kg. The cattle are bred primarily for beef, but the cows produce around 3,200 kg of milk per year. They are well adapted to pasture in alpine altitudes.

Breeding history 

Blood typing shows the Herens to be distinct from other Swiss breeds but similar to the Tuxer breed from the Zillertal in Austria. 
In 1884 a breeding standard was introduced for this old breed. In 1917 a specialised breeding union was founded.

Herens cattle were often cross bred with other cattle breeds in the alpine region. For example, Tux Cattle, Évolène Cattle, and Pustertal Pied Cattle may be partially related to the Herens. The population of Herens has decreased since the 1960s. In the year 2000 the population was about 13,500 animals. Pure-bred bulls are bred at an insemination station in Neuchâtel. There is a breed society in the United States.

Cow fighting

The Herens is well known for the high aggression of its females. In spring, cows and heifers are made to fight one against another in five weight classes in the local tradition of "cow fighting". The winners are sold for high prices. Today cow fights are a major tourist attraction in the Valais.

References

External links 
 Schweizer Eringerviehzuchtverband

Cattle breeds
Cattle breeds originating in Switzerland